Wayne Burden is a retired American basketball player. He graduated in 1974 from William G. Enloe High School in Raleigh, North Carolina, and played one year of Division 2 college basketball at California State University, Chico, where he averaged 21.1 points per game. Between 1983 and 1990, he played seven seasons in the Australian NBL with the Frankston Bears (1983–84), Sydney Supersonics (1985–86), and Hobart Devils (1987–88; 1990). He led the NBL in 3-point percentage (47.8%; 34/71) during the 1986 season. After retiring from basketball he worked as a security agent.

References

Hobart Devils players
Living people
Year of birth missing (living people)